Stephen Antony McLaughlin (born 14 June 1990) is an Irish footballer who plays for League Two club Mansfield Town as a defender.

Career

Early years
McLaughlin began his career at his local club St. Mary's, and played all his under-age football for the club. In 2006, he signed for Clonmany Shamrocks senior side of the Inishowen Football League, and was successful during his first spell in junior football.

Finn Harps
After appearing in League and Cup finals for Clonmany, McLaughlin was signed by Finn Harps, and played for their Under 20 and A Championship sides upon arrival. He was then called into the first-team, and went on to play several games for the club in the 2008 season. He was then assigned the no. 7 jersey for the 2009 campaign, with manager James Gallagher using McLaughlin right across the midfield and front-line.

Derry City
He signed for Derry City after the 2010 season, after impressing in games against Derry at both Finn Park and the Brandywell. The move was touted at the end of the season, with McLaughlin signing terms with Stephen Kenny's side in January 2011. He wore the no. 15 shirt for the Candystripes. McLaughlin secured promotion from the League of Ireland First Division with the club in his first season, and won the FAI Cup in his second, netting 17 goals along the way.

Nottingham Forest
McLaughlin signed with English Championship side Nottingham Forest on 3 January 2013, believed to be for a fee of roughly £160,000. McLaughlin did not make an appearance during the remainder of the 2012–13 season. After a spell out on loan to Bristol City at the start of the 2013 season, McLaughlin made his full Forest debut against Leeds United on 21 April 2014 under caretaker manager Gary Brazil. At the beginning of the 2014–15 season under Stuart Pearce, McLaughlin became a more prominent member of the first team, with four appearances from the bench in Forest's first six games.

As appearances for the first team at Forest became increasingly limited, McLaughlin joined their local rivals Notts County on a one-month emergency loan on 30 September 2014.

Southend (loan)
After a spell back at Forest, McLaughlin signed with Southend United until the end of the 2014–15 season.
His debut for the Shrimpers was away at Bury, however this lasted just six minutes as the game was abandoned due to torrential rain, and his next game was at home to Mansfield which Southend won 2–0, and McLaughlin played 87 minutes. He scored twice in his spell for the Shrimpers, the first was in a 2–0 win over Newport and the second helped Southend to Wembley Stadium as he scored in extra time of the League 2 play-off semi-final against Stevenage. He went on to play an hour in the final against Wycombe Wanderers, which Southend eventually won 7–6 on penalties meaning that they won promotion to League One. After that game McLaughlin's loan spell ended, although having been released by Nottingham Forest, he has been linked with a permanent move back to Southend.

Southend United
On 27 August 2015, McLaughlin joined Southend United on a permanent deal, signing a two-year deal. McLaughlin made his debut as a substitute against Coventry City on 31 August 2015. He left at the end of the 2019–20 season after Southend was relegated.

Mansfield Town
On 11 September 2020, McLaughlin signed with Mansfield Town on a short term deal.

After missing out on promotion with defeat in the 2022 EFL League Two play-off Final, McLaughlin signed a new two-year contract in July 2022.

Career statistics

Honours
Derry City
League of Ireland Cup: 2011
FAI Cup: 2012
Southend United
Football League Two play-offs: 2014–15
Individual

 PFAI Premier Division Team of the Year: 2012 
 Mansfield Town Player of the Season: 2021–22

References

External links

1990 births
Living people
Association footballers from County Donegal
Republic of Ireland association footballers
Association football midfielders
Finn Harps F.C. players
Derry City F.C. players
Nottingham Forest F.C. players
Bristol City F.C. players
Notts County F.C. players
Southend United F.C. players
Mansfield Town F.C. players
League of Ireland XI players
League of Ireland players
English Football League players